Split Enz were a New Zealand new wave band from Auckland. Formed in October 1972, the group originally consisted of vocalist and pianist Tim Finn, vocalist and guitarist Phil Judd, bassist Mike Chunn, violinist Miles Golding and flautist Mike Howard, who were joined a few months later by drummer Div Vercoe. The band remained active until December 1984, at which point the lineup featured Finn, keyboardist Eddie Rayner, percussionist Noel Crombie (both since 1974), bassist Nigel Griggs, vocalist/guitarist Neil Finn (both since 1977), and drummer Paul Hester (since 1983). Since disbanding, Split Enz have reunited on a number of occasions.

History

1972–77
Brian (Tim) Finn and Phil Judd formed Split Ends as an acoustic group in October 1972, adding bassist Jonathan (Mike) Chunn, violinist Miles Golding and flautist Mike Howard. Chunn's younger brother Geoff played drums at the quintet's first show on 10 December 1972. David "Div" Vercoe joined in time for the recording of the band's debut single "For You" in February 1973, before he was dismissed soon after for being difficult to work with. Golding and Howard also left after the single's recording, at which time the group became an electric outfit, Paul "Wally" Wilkinson (lead guitar) joined the band and drummer Geoff Chunn joined full time. By late 1973, the band had released their second single "The Sweet Talkin' Spoon Song", the b-side of which, "129", featured Robert Gillies on saxophone.

In early 1974, Split Ends changed the spelling of their name to Split Enz, and expanded to a seven-piece lineup with the addition of Eddie Rayner on keyboards and Robert Gillies becoming a full member on saxophone and trumpet. During the summer, Gillies left, Geoff Chunn was replaced by Paul (Emlyn) Crowther, and Geoff (Noel) Crombie joined on percussion. This lineup issued the group's debut full-length album Mental Notes in 1975. By November, Wilkinson had left and Gillies rejoined. After 1976's follow-up Second Thoughts, several more changes in personnel followed – in December 1976, Crowther was replaced by Malcolm Green, Judd and Chunn left at the end of a North American tour in March, and Finn replaced them with his brother Neil and Nigel Griggs, respectively, in time for a British tour which started the next month. This new lineup issued Dizrythmia later in the year.

1977–84
By early 1978, Split Enz had parted ways with their record company Chrysalis Records, Robert Gillies had left the band for a second time, and Phil Judd had returned briefly before leaving just a few weeks later. After a number of recording sessions which remained unreleased until 2007 in the form of The Rootin Tootin Luton Tapes, the six-piece group issued Frenzy in 1979, followed by True Colours in 1980 and Waiata in 1981. Shortly after the latter's release, drummer Malcolm Green left the band and moved to Australia following "disagreements regarding [his] songwriting and inclusion of his songs on the band's albums".

Green was not replaced, with percussionist Noel Crombie taking over his role. As a five-piece, Split Enz issued Time and Tide and Conflicting Emotions, before Paul Hester took over on drums for the Conflicting Emotions Tour at the end of 1983, with Crombie moving back to percussion. Just a few months into the tour, however, with tensions growing between himself and his brother, Tim Finn announced on 16 June 1984 that he was leaving Split Enz, leaving the group with no original members. The group began recording a new album with Neil Finn as band leader, although he was uncomfortable continuing the band without any of its founders, and decided the resulting See Ya 'Round would be Split Enz's last album. After the album's release Tim Finn rejoined the band for the final Enz with a Bang! Tour, which began on 30 September 1984. Split Enz's final show took place on 4 December 1984. Neil Finn and Paul Hester went on to form Crowded House the following year.

From 1984

Since their breakup in 1984, Split Enz have reunited on a number of occasions. The first reunion took place on 5 April 1986 at the Rainbow Warrior Music Festival, a benefit concert for Greenpeace held at Auckland's Mount Smart Stadium. Joined again by Tim Finn, the reunited group also performed at the debut show of Crowded House, the new band of Neil Finn and Paul Hester, two months later. The second reunion followed in December 1989 when the group played four shows in Australia, again with Crowded House, followed by a show in February 1990 to benefit the victims of an earthquake in Newcastle, New South Wales which killed the tour's manager.

To mark the 20th anniversary of the formation of Split Enz, as well as the release of Mike Chunn's autobiography Stranger than Fiction: The Life and Times of Split Enz, several former members of the group performed a set at Auckland's Wynyard Tavern on 10 December 1992 – exactly 20 years after their live debut at the same venue. A full reunion tour of New Zealand followed in March 1993, with Nigel Griggs and Paul Hester returning again. In December 1999, Split Enz reunited for a fifth time to perform at the Millennium Concert in Auckland. A sixth reunion followed three years later to mark the 30th anniversary of the band's formation and live debut.

On 14 July 2005, Split Enz performed at their induction into the ARIA Hall of Fame in Melbourne. Less than three months previously, Hester had committed suicide after "a long battle with depression". For the Hall of Fame performance, 1976–1981 Split Enz drummer Malcolm Green took his place. The same lineup returned the following June for a short tour of Australia. Another reunion tour followed in March 2008, with four shows in New Zealand featuring John Butler Trio drummer Michael Barker in place of the unavailable Green. A final one-off reunion performance (with Barker on drums) took place on 14 March 2009 as part of the Sound Relief festival.

In a 2018 interview, keyboardist Eddie Rayner predicted that Split Enz would not reunite again, explaining that "Everybody's got too much going on in their lives".

Members

Timeline

Original

Reunions

Lineups

References

Footnotes

External links
Split Enz unofficial website

Split Enz